Habibpur Assembly constituency is an assembly constituency in Malda district in the Indian state of West Bengal. It is reserved for scheduled tribes.

Overview
As per orders of the Delimitation Commission, No. 43 Habibpur Assembly constituency (ST) covers Bamangola community development block  and Aktail, Baidyapur, Bulbul Chandi, Dhumpur, Habibpur, Jajail, Kanturka and Mangalpur gram panchayats of Habibpur community development block.

Habibpur Assembly constituency is part of No. 7 Maldaha Uttar (Lok Sabha constituency). It was earlier part of Malda (Lok Sabha constituency).

Members of Legislative Assembly

Election results

2021

2019 by-election

2016

2011
In the 2011 election, Khagen Murmu of CPI(M) defeated his nearest rival Mohan Tudu of Trinamool Congress.

.# Trinamool Congress did not contest in 2006, but had supported BJP. Swing based on Congress vote percentage in 2006. BJP's negative swing in 2011 also adjusted in the final swing.

1977-2006
In the 2006 state assembly elections Khagen Murmu of CPI(M) won the Habibpur (ST) assembly seat defeating his nearest rival Ramlal Hansda of BJP. Contests in most years were multi cornered but only winners and runners are being mentioned. Jadu Hembrom of CPI(M) defeated Ramlal Hansda of BJP in 2001 and Lucas Hembram of Congress in 1996. Sarkar Murmu of CPI(M) defeated Gopinath Murmu of Congress in 1991, Moshi Charan Tudu of Congress in 1987 and 1982, and Bobila Murmu of Janata Party in 1977.

1962–1972
Rabindranath Murmu of CPI won in 1972. Sarkar Murmu, Independent, won in 1971. Nimai Chand Murmu of CPI won in 1969. B.Murmu of Congress won in 1967. Nimai Chand Murmu of CPI won in 1962. Prior to that the constituency did not exist.

References

Assembly constituencies of West Bengal
Politics of Malda district